"Bang" is a song by the Soviet rock band Gorky Park, released in 1989 as the lead single from the band's self-titled debut album.

The music video for "Bang" received heavy rotation on the American MTV, where it stayed two months in MTV's Top 15, peaking at number 3. The song reached number 41 on the Billboard Hot Mainstream Rock Tracks, but didn't enter the Hot 100. In Europe, the single was probably most successful in Norway, where it spent 6 weeks in the VG-lista Topp 10, four of them at number 5.

Track listings

Charts

References 

Gorky Park (band) songs
Vertigo Records singles
Mercury Records singles
1989 songs
1989 singles